The Dadu River is a river in Sichuan.

Dadu River may also refer to:

Dadu River (Taiwan)
Dadu River (film), based on the 1935 crossing of the Sichuan river by the Red Army